Antonio Serra (born 16 February 1963) is an Italian comics writer.

Biography
Serra was born in Alghero, Sardinia. After some collaborations with amateur publications, in 1991, together with Michele Medda and Bepi Vigna, he created the science fiction series Nathan Never for Sergio Bonelli Editore, for which he had worked since 1985.

He is also the creator of two more science-fiction series, Gregory Hunter, published by Bonelli in 2000–2002, and Greystorm, published by Bonelli in 2010–2011.

References

1963 births
Living people
People from Alghero
Italian comics writers